Vol.2 is a compilation album by American rock band Goo Goo Dolls, serving as the second volume to Greatest Hits Volume One: The Singles. It consists of two discs: one, a CD with previously unreleased tracks, b-sides, rarities, new covers, fan favorites and live performances; the other, a DVD with 23 music videos and videos from live performances. A limited edition of the album with the entire Red Rocks concert on the DVD is available on the Goo Goo Dolls website.

Track listing

Disc 1 (CD)
The Songs
"Hate This Place" – 4:24
"Stop the World" – 3:32
"Long Way Down" – 3:28
"All Eyes On Me" (Live at Red Rocks) – 4:37
"Lazy Eye" – 3:44
"Iris" (Demo) – 4:18
"I'm Awake Now" – 3:16
"Torn Apart" – 2:05
"No Way Out" – 2:39
"String of Lies" – 3:07
"We'll Be Here (When You're Gone)" (New Mix) – 5:55
"Without You Here" – 3:48
"Only One" – 3:18
"Truth Is A Whisper" – 4:00
"What A Scene" – 4:27
"Million Miles Away" (The Plimsouls) – 2:44
"I Wanna Destroy You" (The Soft Boys) – 2:34
"Wait for the Blackout" (The Damned) – 3:38
"Slave Girl" (Lime Spiders) – 2:22
"Don't Change" (INXS) – 3:39
"I Don't Wanna Know" (Fleetwood Mac) – 3:37
"American Girl" (Live) (Tom Petty and the Heartbreakers) – 3:50

Disc 2 (DVD)
The Videos
"There You Are"
"We Are The Normal"
"Only One"
"Flat Top"
"Name"
"Naked"
"Long Way Down"
"Lazy Eye"
"Iris"
"Slide"
"Black Balloon"
"Dizzy"
"Broadway"
"Here Is Gone"
"Sympathy"
"Stay With You"
"Let Love In"
Live at Red Rocks
"Long Way Down"
"Slide"
"Feel the Silence"
"Before It's Too Late"
"Slave Girl"
"Better Days"

The Limited Edition on the Goo Goo Dolls website contains all of the music videos listed above and the entire Red Rocks concert listed below.

Long Way Down
Big Machine
Slide
Feel The Silence
Black Balloon
Lucky Star
January Friend
Cuz You're Gone
Become
All Eyes On Me
Name
Before It's Too Late
Slave Girl
Stay With You
Let Love In
Better Days
Iris
Naked
Broadway

References

2008 greatest hits albums
Goo Goo Dolls compilation albums
Albums produced by Glen Ballard
2008 video albums
2008 live albums
Live video albums
Music video compilation albums
Warner Records compilation albums
Warner Records live albums
Warner Records video albums
Goo Goo Dolls live albums
Goo Goo Dolls video albums